Gail Smith (born September 4, 1955) is a former Canadian television journalist and news anchor. From Trenton, Ontario, Smith received her bachelor's degree in mathematics and a master's degree in journalism from the University of Western Ontario.

Her broadcasting career started in 1978, first as a television news reporter for BCTV in Vancouver, British Columbia, and then as a producer and news anchor. Smith moved to Toronto, Ontario and joined CFTO in February 1982 as a television news reporter. Her career advancement at CFTO occurred at a time when the television news networks in Toronto competed to hire women as news anchors and attract larger audiences.

On September 4, 1982, Smith became the first female weekend news anchor at CFTO. After the television ratings for the weekend news program climbed 55 per cent, she became the station's first female late night news anchor on Night Beat News the following year. On August 20, 1984, she was paired with Tom Gibney to co-anchor the early evening news program, World Beat News, the station's top-ranked newscast at the time.

After a decade-long career in television news which included six years in Toronto, Smith resigned from CFTO. After an absence of nearly five years, Smith returned to television briefly as an afternoon news anchor for CKVR in Barrie, Ontario, on March 3, 1993.

References

Canadian television news anchors
Canadian television reporters and correspondents
Canadian women television journalists
1955 births
Living people
University of Western Ontario alumni
Carleton University alumni
People from Quinte West